Hog Island Wildlife Management Area is a  Wildlife Management Area along the lower James River in Virginia. It comprises three separate tracts of land: The Hog Island and Carlisle tracts in Surry County, and the Stewart Tract in Isle of Wight County.

Description
Most of the area's low-elevation land is flat and open, consisting of tidal marshland and controlled ponds. The Hog Island Tract contains an extensive system of dikes to help create seasonally flooded areas to provide food and habitat for wintering waterfowl and migrating birds; some agricultural crops are also grown in the area for the same purpose. Within the Carlisle Tract, relatively upland areas have been planted with loblolly pine as well as cover crops for the benefit of wildlife. Lawnes Creek runs through the Carlisle and Stewart tracts, where it is bordered by marshland.

Public access
Hog Island Wildlife Management Area is owned and maintained by the Virginia Department of Game and Inland Fisheries, and is open to the public for hunting, trapping, fishing, hiking, and boating. The Carlisle Tract includes a boat ramp. Horseback riding and primitive camping are permitted only within the Carlisle Tract. Access for persons 17 years of age or older requires a valid hunting or fishing permit, a current Virginia boat registration, or a WMA access permit.

The area is included on the Captain John Smith Chesapeake National Historic Trail along the James River. Opportunities to view wildlife, including large numbers of bald eagles that are frequently observed on and near the property, are facilitated by two wildlife viewing platforms that are available within the Hog Island Tract.

See also
 List of Virginia Wildlife Management Areas

References

External links
Virginia Department of Game and Inland Fisheries: Hog Island Wildlife Management Area

Wildlife management areas of Virginia
Protected areas of Surry County, Virginia
Protected areas of Isle of Wight County, Virginia